Henry Akona is an American theater director and composer.

References

External links
 Website for Henry Akona

Living people
Year of birth missing (living people)
American theatre directors